Vallenato-salsa is a style of salsa music associated with Colombia.  It is a combination of vallenato and salsa, and its most popular exponents are accordionists like Lizandro Meza and Alfredo Gutiérrez.

References

Salsa music
Colombian styles of music